Mohammad Ali Farrokhian (1935 – 27 January 2022) was an Iranian freestyle wrestler. He won silver medals in the 57 kg division at the 1965 World Wrestling Championships and 1966 Asian Games. Farrokhian died on 27 January 2022, at the age of 86.

References

1935 births
2022 deaths
People from Shiraz
Iranian male sport wrestlers
World Wrestling Championships medalists
Medalists at the 1966 Asian Games
Asian Games medalists in wrestling
Wrestlers at the 1966 Asian Games
Asian Games silver medalists for Iran
Sportspeople from Fars province
20th-century Iranian people